Geles Cabrera Alvarado (born August 2, 1929 in Mexico City)  is a Mexico City sculptor who has worked in a variety of materials, there is a museum dedicated to her work in the south of the city.

Life
Geles Cabrera was born in Mexico City to Salvador Cabrera and Jovita Alvarado. Her father was a civil engineer and the owner of a factory that made paper mache decorations in art nouveau style for upper-class homes. Two of her aunts were recognized artists: Rosario Cabrera, a painter who worked with the art schools promoted by José Vasconcelos and Consuelito Cabrera, a soprano.

Her interest in art began young and was encouraged by the family. Geles’ interests include music well as art, studying both dance and visual arts. From 1943 to 1947, she studied mornings at the Academy of San Carlos, and in the afternoons/evenings, she studied classical and folk dance at the Escuela de Danza, which was at the Abelardo L. Rodriguez Market.
In 1947, her father had to close the factory and the family moved to Cuba, where he worked building bridges. In this country, she continued her art studies at the San Alejandro Academy, where she met Wifredo Lam. In 1948 and 1949, she won second then first place at the Salón de Bellas Artes in Havana.

The family returned to Mexico in 1949, and Geles enrolled into Escuela Nacional de Pintura, Escultura y Grabado "La Esmeralda". During this time, movie actress Dolores del Río decided to pose for a select group of students, with Geles being one. The artist created a bust that pleased the actress’s mother and which accompanied Del Río during her career.
Cabrera married physician Rafael Cano, who supported her work during the sixty five years of marriage. The couple had five children: Salvador, Erika, Irma, Iris and Rafael.
She still lives and works in Mexico City.

Career
She had her first individual exhibition at the Mont Orendaín Gallery (Colonia Roma) in 1949. Paul Westheim, commenting about the exhibit, said, “Lehmbruck, Brancusi, Lipschitz, Moore: Geles has placed herself among them.” 
Over her career, Cabrera has had  over twenty two individual exhibitions and has participated in over fifty collective ones. These include two exhibits in 2009 in the Coyoacán metro station (Line 3) and in the Botanical Garden of the Mexican National Autonomous University (UNAM).
She has published three books, and in 1975 was a founding member of GUCADIGOSE along with Ángela Gurría, Juan Luis Diez, Mathias Goeritz and Sebastian. Later the group became BACADIGUGOSETA with the addition of Herbert Bayer de la Bauhaus y Tamayo. The aim of the group was to make three dimensional work within an urban setting.
She has received awards and other recognition in Mexico and abroad, in countries such as Belgium, Bulgaria, the United States, Cuba and Israel. Her work has been written about by critics such as Paul Westheim, Margarita Nelken, Antonio Rodríguez, María Luisa Mendoza, Raquel Tibol and Makario Matus.  In 1949, she received first prize in the thirty-first Fine Arts Salon of Havana and in 1985, she was granted first prize in sculpture in Gabrovo, Bulgaria. She was invited to become a member of the Salón de la Plástica Mexicana in 1949, and she appeared in the documentary Escultura es cultura, along with Feliciano Bejar, Pedro Cervantes, Antonio Nava and others.
She dedicated 37 years to teaching art in the José Vasconcelos National Preparatory School  No. 5, part of the National Autonomous University of Mexico.
Examples of her work can be found in the Geles Cabrera Sculpture Museum of Art in Coyoacán, Mexico City. Ceramist Irma Peralta was among her pupils.

Artistry
Her sculpture focuses on the female body in modular shapes. Common themes include love, loneliness and being a mother.  First working in clay, metal and stone based on prehistoric art, she uses clear lines to emphasize the human form´s eroticism. Later, she began using newspaper as an artistic material.

Geles Cabrera Sculpture Museum
In 1966 she founded a free museum for sculpture called the Museo Escultório, next to her husband’s clinic. She maintained this museum for forty years with her earnings from teaching. Today it is the Museo Escultórico Geles Cabrera, the first museum dedicated to sculpture from the Americas, but it is practically unknown. It contains a permanent collection of Mexican sculpture in various materials including sixty pieces by Cabrera from 1948. Cabrera describes the museum as “the communication of art and sculpture to the people, to the community. Here there are no signs that say “don’t touch.”  One of the touchable sculptures is a swing, which when ridden produces a human heartbeat. Many of the museum’s visitors are children coming as part of classes from school.

References

Mexican artists
1929 births
Living people
20th-century Mexican women artists